Brahim Benmokrane is a Canadian civil engineer, currently a Canada Research Chair in Composite Materials used in Civil Engineering Structures and Research Chair in Innovative FRP Reinforcement for Sustainable Concrete Infrastructure at University of Sherbrooke and a Fellow of the Royal Society of Canada.

References

Year of birth missing (living people)
Living people
Academic staff of the Université de Sherbrooke
Canadian civil engineers
Université de Sherbrooke alumni